A long weekend is a weekend that is at least three days long (i.e. a three-day weekend), due to a public or unofficial holiday occurring on either the following Monday or preceding Friday.

Many countries also have four-day weekends, in which two days adjoining the weekend are holidays. Examples are Good Friday / Easter Monday, and Christmas Day / Boxing Day (e.g. when Christmas Day occurs on a Thursday or Monday).

Four day "bridge" weekends 
In many countries, when a lone holiday occurs on a Tuesday or a Thursday, the day between the holiday and the weekend may also be designated as a holiday, set to be a movable or floating holiday, or work/school may be interrupted by consensus unofficially. This is typically referred to by a phrase involving "bridge" in many languages; for example in some Spanish-speaking countries the term is puente ("bridge") or simply "fin de semana largo".

Four-day bridge weekends are commonplace in non-English speaking countries, but there are only a couple of examples in English-speaking countries:

In the United States, the fourth Thursday of November is Thanksgiving; but the adjacent Friday is a non-working day for most or all staff in many organizations.

In Melbourne, Australia, the Melbourne Cup holiday is held on a Tuesday. The Monday is not a public holiday, but many people modify their work arrangements to also have the Monday off and many schools will have a "pupil free day", so it is colloquially referred to as the "Cup Day long weekend".

Europe
In Flanders, the Dutch-speaking part of Belgium, "brugdag" ("bridge" day) is used.
In the Netherlands also "Klemdag" is used.

In France, a bridge idiom is used: faire le pont ("to make the bridge") is used to mean taking additional holiday days. For example, if there is already an official holiday on Thursday, one could "faire le pont" on the Friday and thus have a four-day weekend (Thursday through Sunday inclusive).

In the German language, a bridge-related term is also used: a day taken off from work to fill the gap between a holiday Thursday (or Tuesday) and the weekend is called a Brückentag ("bridge day") in Germany and Switzerland, and a Fenstertag ("window day") in Austria. Since Ascension day is a holiday throughout Germany and Corpus Christi is a holiday in large parts of the country (both of these holidays are always on Thursdays), such "bridge days" are fairly common, though always unofficial in character.

Italians use the idiom 'Fare il ponte', literally, 'Make the bridge.' This could be a Thursday-Sunday weekend if the bridge was over Friday, or a Saturday-Tuesday weekend if the bridge was over a Monday.

In Norway, the term "oval weekend" (oval helg in Norwegian) is used. An ordinary weekend is conceived of as "round" (although this is not stated explicitly), and adding extra days off makes it "oval". Norwegians also refer to "inneklemte" (squeezed in) days, which are between a public holiday and a weekend. This is typical for the Friday after Ascension Day, which always falls on a Thursday. It is common not to work on such days, so as to be able to extend the weekend to four days.

In Poland, long weekends occur several times a year. The term długi weekend (long weekend) is commonly used in the Polish language. As well as the Easter weekend and the Christmas weekend, there is Corpus Christi weekend (Corpus Christi is always on Thursday and people usually take Friday off as well) and it may occur also around other holidays. However, the best known long weekend is at the beginning of May, when there are holidays of Labour Day on May 1 and 3 May Constitution Day. The weekend can in fact be up to 9 days long (April 28 – May 6) and, taking one to three days off work, Poles often go for small holidays then.

Portugal also uses the bridge idiom with the Portuguese word ponte.

In Slovenian, the term podaljšan vikend ("prolonged weekend") is used for a three-day weekend. Four-day weekends also happen, because May 1 and May 2 are public holidays (both May Day). A peculiar coincidence are Christmas Day and Independence Day, falling on two consecutive dates.

In the United Kingdom and some other British Commonwealth countries, and in Ireland, the term is often known as a Bank Holiday weekend, since bank holidays always fall on a Monday.

In Spain, the bridge becomes a puente in some years when the anniversary of the Spanish Constitution of 1978 (December 6) and the Blessed Virgin Mary's Immaculate Conception (December 8) and a weekend plus a movable holiday form a block of five days.

In Sweden, a day between a weekend and a bank holiday is called a klämdag ("squeeze day"). Many Swedes take a vacation day to have a long weekend.

Middle East
In Israel, a "bridge" metaphor is also used: "yom gesher" ("", literally "bridge day").

North America
In the United States, the Uniform Monday Holiday Act officially moved federal government observances of many holidays to Mondays,  largely at the behest of the travel industry. The resulting long weekends are often termed "three-day weekends" as a result. A well-known four-day weekend starts with Thanksgiving and Black Friday after.

South America
In Argentina, some national holidays that occur on a Tuesday, Wednesday, Thursday or Friday (sometimes even on a Saturday) are officially moved to the closest Monday in order to create a long weekend.

In Brazil, when a holiday occurs in a Tuesday or a Thursday, some sectors of the society, as government and education, turn the day between the holiday and the weekend into a holiday. The four-day or even the three-day weekends are called in Brazilian Portuguese feriados prolongados ("Extended holidays") or its popular form feriadão ("big holiday"). The bridge day is usually called "imprensado" ("pressed (in between)") or "enforcado" ("hanged").

In Chile, a "sandwich" is a day that falls between two holidays, independently of whether it's a holiday by itself or not. In the latter case, workers may take it off on account on vacation days, an action called "tomarse el sandwich" (lit.: "taking the sandwich"). In formal writings, the term "interferiado" is used instead of "sandwich". In colloquial contexts, these days, almost always a Monday or a Friday, may be called "San Lunes" or "San Viernes" (lit.: "Saint Monday" and "Saint Friday", respectively) as well.

Asia
In Indonesia, when a holiday occurs on a Tuesday or Thursday, the day between that day and the weekend is colloquially termed "Harpitnas" ('Hari Kejepit Nasional') (lit. National Sandwiched Day, a play on Hardiknas, National Education Day) causing some institutions to declare a day off, or some students or employees unilaterally declaring a day off for themselves, thereby creating a long weekend.

In Japan, a weekday which falls between two public holidays is legally a public holiday.

See also 
Public holiday
List of holidays by country
The Long Week-End
Holiday economics

References

Holidays
Weeks
Units of time
Working time